Kabul is the capital and largest city of Afghanistan. Located in the eastern half of the country, it is also a municipality, forming part of the Kabul Province; it is administratively divided into 22 municipal districts. According to late 2022 estimates, the population of Kabul was 3.5 million people. In contemporary times, the city has served as Afghanistan's political, cultural, and economical center, and rapid urbanisation has made Kabul the 75th-largest city in the world and the country's primate city.

The modern-day city of Kabul is located high up in a narrow valley between the Hindu Kush, and is bounded by the Kabul River. Kabul is said to be over 3,500 years old, mentioned since at least the time of the Achaemenid Persian Empire. Located at a crossroads in Asia—roughly halfway between Istanbul, Turkey, in the west and Hanoi, Vietnam, in the east—it is situated in a strategic location along the trade routes of Central Asia and South Asia, and was a key destination on the ancient Silk Road; It was traditionally seen as the meeting point between Tartary, India, and Persia. Kabul has also been under the rule of various other dynasties and empires, including the Seleucids, the Kushans, the Hindu Shahis, Western Turks, the Turk Shahis, the Samanids, the Khwarazmians, the Timurids, and the Mongols, among others. In the 16th century, the Mughal Empire used Kabul as a summer capital, during which time it prospered and increased in significance. It briefly came under the control of the Afsharids following Nader Shah's invasion of India, until finally becoming coming under local rule by the Afghan Empire in 1747; Kabul became the capital of Afghanistan in 1776, during the reign of Timur Shah Durrani (a son of Ahmad Shah Durrani). In the 19th century, the city was occupied by the British, but after establishing foreign relations and agreements, they were compelled to withdraw all forces from Afghanistan and returned to British India.

Kabul is known for its historical gardens, bazaars, and palaces; well-known examples are the Gardens of Babur and Darul Aman Palace, as well as the Arg. In the second half of the 20th century, it became a stop on the hippie trail undertaken by many Europeans, and the city also gained the nickname "Paris of Central Asia" during this time. However, this period of tranquility ended in 1978 with the Saur Revolution and subsequent Soviet military intervention in 1979, which sparked the protracted Soviet–Afghan War until 1989. The 1990s were marked by continuous civil wars between various splinter factions of the disbanded Afghan mujahideen, which destroyed much of the city. In 1996, Kabul was captured by the Taliban after four years of intermittent fighting with other Afghan factions. However, the Taliban-ruled city soon fell to the United States after the American-led invasion of Afghanistan in 2001. In 2021, Kabul was re-captured by the Taliban following the withdrawal of American-led military forces from Afghanistan.

Toponymy and etymology
Kabul is also spelled as Cabool, Cabol, Kabol, or Cabul.

Kabul was known by different names throughout history. Its meaning is unknown, but "certainly pre-dates the advent of Islam when it was an important centre on the route between India and the Hellenic world". In Sanskrit, it was known as Kubha, whereas Greek authors of classical antiquity referred to it as Kophen, Kophes or Koa. The Chinese traveler Xuanzang (fl. 7th century CE) recorded the city as Kaofu（高附）. The name "Kabul" was first applied to the Kabul river before being applied to the area situated between the Hindu Kush and Sindh (present-day Pakistan). This area was also known as Kabulistan. Alexander Cunningham (died 1893) noted in the 19th century that Kaofu as recorded by the Chinese was in all likelihood the name of "one of the five Yuchi or Tukhari tribes". Cunningam added that this tribe gave its name to the city after it was occupied by them in the 2nd century BCE. This "supposition seems likely" as the Afghan historian Mir Ghulam Mohammad Ghobar (1898–1978) wrote that in the Avesta (sacred book of Zoroastrianism), Kabul was known as Vaekereta, whereas the Greeks of antiquity referred to it as Ortospana ("High Place"), which corresponds to the Sanskrit word Urddhastana, which was applied to Kabul. The Greek geographer Ptolemy (died  CE) recorded Kabul as Καβουρα (Kabura).

According to a legend, one could find a lake in Kabul, in the middle of which the so-called "Island of Happiness" could be found, where a joyous family of musicians lived. According to this same legend, the island became accessible by the order of a king through the construction of a bridge (i.e. "pul" in Persian) made out of straw (i.e. "kah" in Persian). According to this legend the name Kabul was thus formed as a result of these two words combined, i.e. kah + pul. The Concise Oxford Dictionary of World Place Names argues that the "suggestion that the name is derived from the Arabic root qbl ‘meeting’ or ‘receiving’ is unlikely".

It remains unknown when the name "Kabul" was first applied to the city. However, it "came into prominence" following the destruction of Kapisa and other cities in what is present-day Afghanistan by Genghis Khan (c. 1162–1227) in the thirteenth century. Due to the centrality of the city within the region, as well as its cultural importance as a nexus of ethnic groups in the region, Kabul became known as the Paris of Central Asia in the late 20th century.

History

Antiquity

The origin of Kabul, who built it and when, is largely unknown. The Hindu Rigveda, composed between 2000 and 1500 BC and one of the four canonical texts of Hinduism, and the Avesta, the primary canon of texts of Zoroastrianism, refer to the Kabul River and to a settlement called Kubha.

The Kabul valley was part of the Median Empire (c. 678–549 BC). In 549 BC, the Median Empire was annexed by Cyrus The Great and Kabul became part the Achaemenid Empire (c. 550–330 BC). During that period, Kabul became a center of learning for Zoroastrianism, followed by Buddhism and Hinduism. An inscription on Darius the Great's tombstone lists Kabul as one of the 29 countries of the Achaemenid Empire.

When Alexander annexed the Achaemenid Empire, the Kabul region came under his control. After his death, his empire was seized by his general Seleucus, becoming part of the Seleucid Empire. In 305 BCE, the Seleucid Empire was extended to the Indus River which led to friction with the neighbouring Mauryan Empire.

During the Mauryan period, trade flourished because of uniform weights and measures. Irrigation facilities for public use were developed leading to an increased harvest of crops. People were also employed as artisans, jewellers, and carpenters.

The Greco-Bactrians took control of Kabul from the Mauryans in the early 2nd century BC, then lost the city to their subordinates in the Indo-Greek Kingdom around the mid-2nd century BC. Buddhism was greatly patronised by these rulers and the majority of people of the city were adherents of the religion. Indo-Scythians expelled the Indo-Greeks by the mid 1st century BC, but lost the city to the Kushan Empire about 100 years later.

It is mentioned as Kophes or Kophene in some classical writings. Hsuan Tsang refers to the city as Kaofu in the 7th century AD, which is the appellation of one of the five tribes of the Yuezhi who had migrated from across the Hindu Kush into the Kabul valley around the beginning of the Christian era. It was conquered by Kushan Emperor Kujula Kadphises in about 45 AD and remained Kushan territory until at least the 3rd century AD. The Kushans were Indo-European-speaking peoples based in Bactria.

Around 230 AD, the Kushans were defeated by the Sassanid Empire and replaced by Sassanid vassals known as the Indo-Sassanids. During the Sassanian period, the city was referred to as "Kapul" in Pahlavi scripts. Kapol in the Persian language means Royal (ka) Bridge (pol), which is due to the main bridge on the Kabul River that connected the east and west of the city. In 420 AD, the Indo-Sassanids were driven out of Afghanistan by the Xionite tribe known as the Kidarites, who were then replaced in the 460s by the Hephthalites. It became part of the surviving Turk Shahi Kingdom of Kapisa, also known as Kabul-Shahan. According to Táríkhu-l Hind by Al-Biruni, Kabul was governed by princes of Turkic lineage.|Abu Rayhan Biruni|978–1048 AD}} It was briefly held by the Tibetan Empire between 801 and 815.

Islamisation and Mongol invasion

The Islamic conquest reached modern-day Afghanistan in 642 AD, at a time when Kabul was independent. A number of failed expeditions were made to Islamise the region. In one of them, Abdur Rahman bin Samara arrived in Kabul from Zaranj in the late 600s and converted 12,000 inhabitants to Islam before abandoning the city. Muslims were a minority until Ya'qub bin Laith as-Saffar of Zaranj conquered Kabul in 870 and established the first Islamic dynasty in the region. It was reported that the rulers of Kabul were Muslims with non-Muslims living close by. Iranian traveller and geographer Istakhri described it in 921:

Over the following centuries, the city was successively controlled by the Samanids, Ghaznavids, Ghurids, Khwarazmshahs, Qarlughids, and Khaljis. In the 13th century, the invading Mongols caused major destruction in the region. Report of a massacre in the close by Bamiyan is recorded around this period, where the entire population of the valley was annihilated by the Mongol troops as revenge for the death of Genghis Khan's grandson. As a result, many natives of Afghanistan fled south toward the Indian subcontinent where some established dynasties in Delhi. The Chagatai Khanate and Kartids were vassals of Ilkhanate until the dissolution of the latter in 1335.

Following the era of the Khalji dynasty in 1333, the famous Moroccan scholar Ibn Battuta was visiting Kabul and wrote:

Timurid and Mughal era

In the 14th century, Kabul became a major trading centre under the kingdom of Timur (Tamerlane). In 1504, the city fell to Babur from the north and made into his headquarters, which became one of the principal cities of his later Mughal Empire. In 1525, Babur described Kabulistan in his memoirs by writing that:

Mirza Muhammad Haidar Dughlat, a poet from Hindustan who visited at the time wrote: "Dine and drink in Kabul: it is mountain, desert, city, river and all else." It was from here that Babur began his 1526 conquest of Hindustan, which was ruled by the Afghan Lodi dynasty and began east of the Indus River in what is present-day Pakistan. Babur loved Kabul due to the fact that he lived in it for 20 years and the people were loyal to him, including the weather that he was used to. His wish to be buried in Kabul was finally granted. The inscription on his tomb contains the famous Persian couplet, which states:

اگرفردوس روی زمین است همین است و همین است و همین است

Transliteration:

Agar fardus rui zamayn, ahmain ast', o ahmain ast', o ahmain ast'.

(If there is a paradise on earth, it is this, it is this, it is this!)

Kabul remained in Mughal control for the next 200 years. Though Mughal power became centred within the Indian subcontinent, Kabul retained importance as a frontier city for the empire; Abul Fazl, Emperor Akbar's chronicler, described it as one of the two gates to Hindustan (the other being Kandahar). As part of administrative reforms under Akbar, the city was made capital of the eponymous Mughal province, Kabul Subah. Under Mughal governance, Kabul became a prosperous urban centre, endowed with bazaars such as the non-extant Char Chatta. For the first time in its history, Kabul served as a mint centre, producing gold and silver Mughal coins up to the reign of Alamgir II. It acted as a military base for Shah Jahan's campaigns in Balkh and Badakhshan. Kabul was also a recreational retreat for the Mughals, who hunted here and constructed several gardens. Most of the Mughals' architectural contributions to the city (such as gardens, fortifications, and mosques) have not survived. During this time, the population was about 60,000.

Under later Mughal Emperors, Kabul became neglected. The empire lost the city when it was captured in 1738 by Nader Shah, who was en route to invade the Indian subcontinent.

Durrani and Barakzai dynasties

Nine years after Nader Shah and his forces invaded and occupied the city as part of the more easternmost parts of his Empire, he was assassinated by his own officers, causing its rapid disintegration. Ahmad Shah Durrani, commander of 4,000 Abdali Afghans, asserted Pashtun rule in 1747 and further expanded his new Afghan Empire. His ascension to power marked the beginning of Afghanistan. By this time, Kabul had lost its status as a metropolitan city, and its population had decreased to 10,000. Interest in the city was renewed when Ahmad Shah's son Timur Shah Durrani, after inheriting power, transferred the capital of the Durrani Empire from Kandahar to Kabul in 1776. Kabul experienced considerable urban development during the reigns of Timur Shah and his successor Zaman Shah; several religious and public buildings were constructed, and diverse groups of Sufis, jurists, and literary families were encouraged to settle the city through land grants and stipends. Kabul's first visitor from Europe was Englishman George Forster, who described 18th-century Kabul as "the best and cleanest city in Asia".

In 1826, the kingdom was claimed by Dost Mohammad Khan, but in 1839 Shujah Shah Durrani was re-installed with the help of the British Empire during the First Anglo-Afghan War. In 1841 a local uprising resulted in the killing of the British resident and loss of mission in Kabul and the 1842 retreat from Kabul to Jalalabad. In 1842 the British returned to Kabul, demolishing the city's main bazaar in revenge before returning to British India (now Pakistan). Akbar Khan took to the throne from 1842 to 1845 and was followed by Dost Mohammad Khan.

The Second Anglo-Afghan War broke out in 1879 when Kabul was under Sher Ali Khan's rule, as the Afghan king initially refused to accept British diplomatic missions and later the British residents were again massacred. During the war, Bala Hissar was partially destroyed by a fire and an explosion.

20th century
Having become an established bazaar city, leather and textile industries developed by 1916. The majority of the population was concentrated on the south side of the river.

Kabul modernised throughout the regime of King Habibullah Khan, with the introduction of electricity, telephone, and a postal service. The first modern high school, Habibia, was established in 1903. In 1919, after the Third Anglo-Afghan War, King Amanullah Khan announced Afghanistan's independence in foreign affairs at Eidgah Mosque in Kabul. Amanullah was reform-minded and he had a plan to build a new capital city on land about 6 km away from Kabul. This area was named Darulaman and it consisted of the famous Darul Aman Palace, where he later resided. Many educational institutions were founded in Kabul during the 1920s. In 1929 King Amanullah left Kabul due to a local uprising orchestrated by Habibullah Kalakani, but he himself was imprisoned and executed after nine months in power by King Nader Khan. Three years later, in 1933, the new king was assassinated during an award ceremony inside a school in Kabul. The throne was left to his 19-year-old son, Zahir Shah, who became the last King of Afghanistan. Unlike Amanullah Khan, Nader Khan and Zahir Shah had no plans to create a new capital city, and thus Kabul remained the country's seat of government.

During the inter-war period France and Germany helped develop the country and maintained high schools and lycees in the capital, providing education for the children of the city's elite families. Kabul University opened in 1932 and by the 1960s western educated Afghans made up the majority of teachers. By the 1960s the majority of instructors at the university had degrees from Western universities.

Kabul's only railway service, the Kabul–Darulaman Tramway, operated for six years from 1923 to 1929.

When Zahir Shah took power in 1933 Kabul had the only  of rail in the country and the country had few internal telegraphs, phone lines or roads. Zahir turned to the Japanese, Germans and Italians for help developing a modern transportation and communication network. A radio tower built by the Germans in 1937 in Kabul allowed instant communication with outlying villages. A national bank and state cartels were organised to allow for economic modernisation. Textile mills, power plants, carpet and furniture factories were also built in Kabul, providing much-needed manufacturing and infrastructure.

During the 1940s and 1950s, urbanisation accelerated and the built-up area was increased to 68 km2 by 1962, an almost fourteen-fold increase compared to 1925. The Serena Hotel opened in 1945 as the first Western style luxury hotel. Under the premiership of Mohammad Daoud Khan in the 1950s, foreign investment and development increased. In 1955, the Soviet Union forwarded $100 million in credit to Afghanistan, which financed public transportation, airports, a cement factory, mechanised bakery, a five-lane highway from Kabul to the Soviet border and dams, including the Salang Pass to the north of Kabul. During the 1960s, Soviet-style microrayon housing estates were built, containing sixty blocks. The government also built many ministry buildings in the brutalist architecture style. In the 1960s the first Marks & Spencer store in Central Asia was built in the city. Kabul Zoo was inaugurated in 1967, which was maintained with the help of visiting German zoologists. During this time, Kabul experimented with liberalisation, notably the loosening of restrictions on speech and assembly which led to student politics in the capital and various demonstrations by Socialist, Maoist, liberal or Islamist factions.

Foreigners flocked to Kabul and the nation's tourism industry picked up speed. To accompany the city with newfound tourism, western-style accommodations were opened in the 1960s, notably the Spinzar Hotel. Western, American and Japanese tourists were visiting the city's attractions including the "celebrated" Chicken Street and the National Museum that used to have some of Asia's finest cultural artifacts. Lonely Planet called it an upcoming "tourist trap" in 1973. Additionally, Pakistanis were also visiting to watch Indian movies in cinemas that were banned in their own country. During this time, Kabul had been nicknamed the Paris of Central Asia. According to J. Bruce Amstutz, an American diplomat in Kabul:

Until the late 1970s, Kabul was a major stop on the famous Hippie trail, coming from Bamyan to the west on towards Peshawar. At the time, Kabul became known for its street sales of hashish and became a major tourist attraction for western hippies.

Occupations wars and Taliban Regime (1996–2001)

On 28 April 1978, President Daoud and most of his family were assassinated in Kabul's Presidential Palace in what is called the Saur Revolution. Pro-Soviet PDPA under Nur Muhammad Taraki seized power and slowly began to institute reforms. Private businesses were nationalised in the Soviet manner. Education was modified into the Soviet model, with lessons focusing on teaching Russian, Marxism–Leninism and learning of other countries belonging to the Soviet bloc.

Amid growing internal chaos and heightened cold war tensions, the U.S. Ambassador to Afghanistan, Adolph Dubs, was kidnapped on his way to work at the U.S. Embassy in Kabul on 14 February 1979 and killed during a rescue attempt at the Serena Hotel. There were conflicting reports of who abducted Dubs and what demands were made for his release. Several senior Soviet officials were in the lobby of the hotel during a standoff with the kidnappers, who were holding Dubs in room 117. Afghan police, acting on the advice of Soviet advisors and over the objections of U.S. officials, launched a rescue attempt, during which Dubs was shot in the head from a distance of six inches and killed. Many questions about the killing remain unanswered.

On 24 December 1979, the Soviet Union invaded Afghanistan and Kabul was heavily occupied by Soviet Armed Forces. In Pakistan, Director-General of the ISI Akhtar Abdur Rahman advocated for the idea of covert operation in Afghanistan by arming Islamic extremists who formed the mujahideen. General Rahman was heard loudly saying: "Kabul must burn! Kabul must burn!", and mastered the idea of proxy war in Afghanistan. Pakistani President Zia-ul-Haq authorised this operation under General Rahman, which was later merged with Operation Cyclone, a programme funded by the United States and carried out by the Central Intelligence Agency.

The Soviets turned the city of Kabul into their command centre during the Soviet–Afghan War, and while fighting was mostly taking place in the countryside, Kabul was widely disturbed. Political crime and guerrilla attacks on military and government targets were common, and the sound of gunfire became commonplace at night in the outskirts. Large numbers of PDPA party members and Soviet troops were kidnapped or assassinated, sometimes in broad daylight, with acts of terrorism committed by civilians, anti-regime militias and also Khalqists. By July 1980, as much as twelve party members were being assassinated on a daily basis, and the Soviet Army stopped patrolling the city in January 1981. A major uprising against the Soviet presence broke out in Kabul in February 1980 in what is called the 3 Hut uprising. It led to a night curfew in the city that would remain in place for seven years. The Soviet Embassy also, was attacked four times with arms fire in the first five years of the war. A Western correspondent revisiting Kabul in December 1983 after a year, said that the city was "converted into a fortress bristling with weapons". Contrastingly, that same year American diplomat Charles Dunbar commented that the Soviet troops' presence was "surprisingly modest", and an author in a 1983 Bulletin of the Atomic Scientists article thought that the Soviet soldiers had a "friendly" atmosphere.

The city's population increased from around 500,000 in 1978 to 1.5 million in 1988. The large influx were mostly internal refugees who fled other parts of the country for safety in Kabul. During this time, women made up 40% of the workforce. Soviet men and women were very common in the city's shopping roads, with the large availability of Western products. Most Soviet civilians (numbering between 8,000 and 10,000) lived in the northeastern Soviet-style Mikrorayon (microraion) housing complex that was surrounded by barbed-wire and armed tanks. They sometimes received abuse from anti-Soviet civilians on the streets. The mujahideen rebels managed to strike at the city a few times—on 9 October 1987, a car bomb planted by a mujahideen group killed 27 people, and on 27 April 1988, in celebrations of the 10th anniversary of the Saur Revolution, a truck bomb killed six people.

After the fall of Mohammad Najibullah's government in April 1992, different mujahideen factions entered the city and formed a government under the Peshawar Accords, but Gulbuddin Hekmatyar's party refused to sign the accords and started shelling the city for power, which soon escalated into a full-scale conflict. This marked the start of a dark period of the city: at least 30,000 civilians were killed in a period known locally as the "Kabul Wars." About 80 percent of the city was devastated and destroyed by 1996. The old city and western areas were among the worst-hit. A New York Times analyst said in 1996 that the city was more devastated than Sarajevo, which was similarly damaged during the Bosnian War at the time.

The city suffered heavily under a bombardment campaign between rival militias which intensified during the summer of 1992. Its geographic location in a narrow valley made it an easy target from rockets fired by militias who based themselves in the surrounding mountains. Within two years' time, the majority of infrastructure was destroyed, a massive exodus of the population left to the countryside or abroad, and electricity and water was completely out. In late 1994, bombardment of the capital came to a temporary halt. These forces took steps to restore law and order. Courts started to work again, convicting individuals inside government troops who had committed crimes. On 27 September 1996, the hardline Taliban militia seized Kabul and established the Islamic Emirate of Afghanistan. They imposed a strict form of Sharia (Islamic law), restricting women from work and education, conducting amputations against common thieves, and hit-squads from the infamous "Ministry for Promotion of Virtue and Prevention of Vice" watching public beatings of people.

21st century

In November 2001, the Northern Alliance captured Kabul after the Taliban had abandoned it following the American invasion. A month later a new government under President Hamid Karzai began to assemble. In the meantime, a NATO-led International Security Assistance Force (ISAF) was deployed in Afghanistan. The war-torn city began to see some positive development as many expatriate Afghans returned to the country. The city's population grew from about 500,000 in 2001 to over 3 million in recent years. Many foreign embassies re-opened. In 2008 the process started to gradually hand over security responsibilities from NATO to Afghan forces. From late 2001 the city has been continuously rebuilt - many of the damaged landmarks were rebuilt or renovated, for example the Gardens of Babur in 2005, the arch of Paghman, the Mahmoud Khan Bridge clock tower in 2013, and the Taj Beg Palace in 2021. Local community efforts have also managed to restore war-ravaged local homes and dwellings.

The city has experienced rapid urbanisation with an increasing population. Many informal settlements have been built. Since the late 2000s, numerous modern housing complexes have been built, many of which are gated and secured, to serve a growing Afghan middle class. Some of these include the Aria City (in District 10) and Golden City (District 8). Some complexes have been built out-of-town, such as the Omid-e-Sabz township (District 13), Qasaba/Khwaja Rawash township (District 15), and Sayed Jamaludin township (District 12).

Throughout the years, a high-security "Green Zone" was formed in the centre of the city. In 2010, a series of manned checkpoints called the Ring of Steel was put into operation. Concrete blast walls also appeared throughout Kabul in the 2000s for security reasons.

Despite frequent terrorist attacks in the city, mainly by Taliban insurgents, the city continued to develop and was the fifth fastest-growing city in the world as of 2012. Until August 2021, the Afghan National Security Forces (ANSF) had been in charge of security in and around the city. Kabul was periodically the scene of deadly bombings carried out mostly by the Taliban and its wing the Haqqani network. Government employees, soldiers and ordinary civilians have all been targets of attacks. The Afghan government called the actions of the terrorists war crimes. The deadliest attack yet was a truck bombing in May 2017. The city was seized during the 2021 Taliban offensive on August 15, 2021; under Taliban rule the city and the country has experienced some relative calm, although a number of terrorist attacks have since been committed by the regional ISIL branch.

Geography

Immediately to the south of the old city are the ancient city walls and the Sher Darwaza mountain, with the Shuhadayi Salihin cemetery behind it. A bit further east is the ancient Bala Hissar fortress with the Kol-e Hasmat Khan lake behind it.

Its location has been described as a "bowl surrounded by mountains". Some of the mountains (which are called koh) include: Khair Khana-e Shamali, Khwaja Rawash, Shakhi Baran Tey, Chihil Sutun, Qurugh, Khwaja Razaq and Sher Darwaza. There are also two mountains in between urban areas to the west: Koh-e Asamai (locally known as the Television hill) and Ali Abad. Hills within the city (which are called tapa) include Bibi Mahro and Maranjan.

The Logar River flows into Kabul from the south, joining the Kabul River not far from the city centre.

The closest foreign capital cities as the crow flies are Islamabad, Dushanbe, Tashkent, New Delhi and Bishkek. Kabul is roughly equidistant between Istanbul (western Asia) and Hanoi (eastern Asia).

Climate
Kabul has a continental, cold semi-arid climate (BSk), with precipitation concentrated in the winter (almost exclusively falling as snow) and spring months. Summers have very low humidity, providing some relief from the heat. Autumns feature warm afternoons and sharply cooler evenings. Spring is the wettest time of the year. Sunny conditions dominate year-round, and the annual mean temperature is only , much lower than that of Afghanistan's other large cities.

Environment
The Kabul River flowed through the heart of the city, dividing the central bazaars. There are several bridges (pul) crossing the river, the major ones being Pul-e Shah-Do Shamshira, Pul-e Bagh-e Omomi, Pul-e Khishti, and Pul-e Mahmoud. Due to climate change, since the 21st century, the river runs dry most of the year, only filling up in the wetter winter and spring seasons.

A large lake and wetland was located just to the southeast from the old city called Kol-e Hashmat Khan. The marsh provides a critical resting place to thousands of birds who fly between the Indian subcontinent and Siberia. In 2017 the government declared the lake a protected area. Some rare species of birds have been spotted at the lake, such as the Eastern imperial eagle and the Dalmatian pelican. Kabul's other large lake is Qargha, located some 9 km northwest from the centre. It is a major attraction for locals as well as foreigners.

Air pollution is a major problem in the city during the winter season, when many residents burn low-quality fuels.

Districts

The city of Kabul located within Kabul District, one of the 15 districts of Kabul Province. As the provincial capital, it forms a municipality (shārwāli) which is further divided into 22 administrative districts called municipal districts or city districts (nāhia), which coincide with the official Police Districts (PD). The number of city districts increased from 11 to 18 in 2005, and then to 22 by 2010 after the incorporation of Districts 14 and 19–22 which were annexed by Kabul Municipality from surrounding rural districts. The city limits have thus substantially increased. Due to demarcation disputes with the provincial administration, some of these new districts are more administered by the provincial districts than the municipality.

District 1 contains most of the old city. Downtown Kabul mostly consist of Districts 2, 4 and 10. In addition, Districts 3 and 6 house many commercial and governmental points of interests. The city's north and west are the most urbanised, as opposed to the south and east.

The table below show the 22 city districts and their settlements, with information about its land size and usage, accurate as of 2011.

Demographics

Kabul's population was estimated in 2020 at about 4.6 million. The city's population has long fluctuated due to the wars. The lack of an up-to-date census means that there are various estimates of the population.

Kabul's population was estimated to have been about 10,000 in 1700, 65,000 by 1878, and 120,000 by 1940. More recently, the population was around 500,000 in 1979, whilst another source claims 337,715 as of 1976. This figure rose to about 1.5 million by 1988, before dramatically dropping in the 1990s. Kabul became one of the fastest-growing cities in the world, with its population growing fourfold from 2001 to 2014. This was partly due to the return of refugees after the fall of the Taliban regime, and partly due to Afghans moving from other provinces mainly due to war between Taliban insurgents and Afghan government forces in their native areas as well as looking for labor. This resulting rapid urbanisation means that many residents today live in informal settlements. Shanty mud-brick homes on the mountainsides and steep hills have been built by them and these are usually poverty-stricken, not connected to the water and electricity grid. Although the settlements are illegal, they have been tolerated by authorities. In 2017 Kabul Municipality started a project to paint the homes in these settlements in bright colors in an effort to "cheer up" residents.

Kabul is and has historically been the most ethnically diverse city in the country, with the population including Afghans from all over the country. About 55% of Kabul's population is Tajik. 25% Hazara, another 20% is Pashtun, and minority ethnic groups include Baloch, Uzbek, Turkmen, and Afghan Hindu. Almost three-quarters of the population of Kabul follow Sunni Islam, and around Twenty-five percent of residents are Shiites. Other religions in the city include Sikhism and Hinduism.

In 1525, Babur described the region in his memoirs by writing that:

Along with Pashtun, Tajik and Hazara communities, who make up the majority of the population of the city, there was a significant population of Uzbek, Turkmen, Kuchi, Qizilbash, Hindu, Sikh and other groups. The broader province of Kabul however, is dominated by Pashtun and Tajik groups. The Dari (Persian) and Pashto languages are widely used in the region, although Dari serves as the lingua franca. Multilingualism is common throughout the area, particularly among the Pashtun people.

The term "Kabuli" (کابلی) is referred to the urbanites of the city. They were ethnic-neutral, typically speak Dari (Persian), were generally secularly educated, and favor Western fashion. Many Kabulites (especially elites and the upper class) left the country during the civil war and are now outnumbered by rural people who moved in from the countryside, mostly refugees but also labor-seekers.

About 68% of the city's population follow Sunni Islam while 30% are Shiites (mainly the Hazaras and Qizilbash). The remaining 2% are followers of Sikhism and Hinduism, as well as one known Christian resident (First Lady Rula Ghani) and one Jewish resident (Zablon Simintov) in the 2010s. It is estimated that there were 500–8,000 Afghan Christians in the country as a whole; due to restrictions on religious freedom, they often worship in secret, rendering it difficult to estimate the number of Christians in Kabul specifically. Hundreds of non-Muslims still remain after the Taliban retakeover Afghanistan. Kabul also has small Indian (which the Sikhs and Hindus belong to)  and Turkish communities (mostly business-owners and investors), and in the 1980s had a sizable Russian community during the Soviet campaign in the country.

Sports

Cricket has historically been the dominant sport in Kabul, with 2 of 3 sports stadiums reserved for it.
Professional sports teams from Kabul

Sports complexes
Alokozay Kabul International Cricket Ground
Ghazi Stadium used for football
Olympic Committee Gymnasium

Government and politics

The municipality's administrative structure consisted of 17 departments under a mayor. Like other provincial municipalities in Afghanistan, the municipality of Kabul dealt with city affairs such as construction and infrastructure. The city districts (nāhia) collected certain taxes and issued building licenses. Each city district had a district head appointed by the mayor, and lead six major departments in the district office. The neighbourhood organisation structure at the nahia level was called a gozar. Kabul has been Divided in to 630 Gozars. A wakil-e gozar was a person chosen to represent a community within a city district.

Kabul's Chief of Police was Lt. Gen. Abdul Rahman Rahimi. The police were part of the Afghan National Police (ANP) under the Ministry of Interior and were arranged by city districts. The Police Chief was selected by the Interior Minister and is responsible for all law enforcement activities throughout the Kabul province.

Economy and infrastructure

Kabul's main products included fresh and dried fruit, nuts, beverages, Afghan rugs, leather and sheep skin products, furniture, antique replicas, and domestic clothes. The World Bank authorised US$25 million for the Kabul Urban Reconstruction Project which closed in 2011. Over the last decade, the United States has invested approximately $9.1 billion into urban infrastructure in Afghanistan. The wars since 1978 have limited the city's economic productivity but after the establishment of the Karzai administration since late 2001, local economic developments have included a number of indoor shopping malls. The first of these was the Kabul City Center, opened 2005. Others have also opened in recent years including Gulbahar Center, City Walk Mall and Majid Mall.

Mandawi Road on the south side of the river, located between Murad Khani and Shur Bazaar neighbourhoods, is one of the main bazaars of Kabul. This wholesale market is very popular amongst locals. Nearby is the Sarai Shahzada money exchange market. Chicken Street is perhaps best known to foreigners.

Kabul's largest industrial hub was located in District 9, on the north banks of the River Kabul and near the airport. About  from downtown Kabul, in Bagrami, a  industrial complex had been completed with modern facilities, which allowed companies to operate businesses there. The park had professional management for the daily maintenance of public roads, internal streets, common areas, parking areas, 24 hours perimeter security, access control for vehicles and people. A number of factories operated there, including the $25 million Coca-Cola bottling plant and the Omaid Bahar juice factory.

According to Transparency International, the government of Afghanistan was the third most-corrupt in the world, as of 2010. Experts believe that the poor decisions of Afghan politicians contributed to the unrest in the region. This also prevented foreign investment in Afghanistan, especially by Western countries. In 2012, there were reportedly $3.9 billion paid to public officials in bribes which contributed to these issues.

Da Afghanistan Bank, the nation's central bank, was headquartered in Kabul. In addition, there are several commercial banks in the city.

Each year about 20,000 foreign tourists visited Afghanistan.

Development planning
A US$1 billion contract was signed in 2013 to commence work on the "New Kabul City", which is a major residential scheme that would accommodate 1.5 million people. In the meantime, many high rise buildings were being constructed in order to control the overcrowding and also to modernise the city.

An initial concept design called the City of Light Development, envisioned by Dr. Hisham N. Ashkouri, for the development and the implementation of a privately based investment enterprise has been proposed for multi-function commercial, historic and cultural development within the limits of the Old City of Kabul, along the southern side of the Kabul River and along Jade Meywand Avenue,

Communications

As of November 2015, there were more than 24 television stations based out of Kabul. Terrestrial TV transmitters were located at the summit of the Koh-e Asamai.

In Kabul, Minister Amir Zai Sangin of the Ministry of Communications and Information Technology maintained statistics regarding telecommunications in the Islamic Republic of Afghanistan. Afghanistan Information Management Services (AIMS) provided software development, capacity development, information management, and project management services to the Afghan Government and other NGOs, thereby supporting their on-the-ground activities.

GSM/GPRS mobile phone services in the city were provided by Afghan Wireless, Etisalat, Roshan, MTN and Salaam. , all of them provided 3G services as well. In November 2006, the Afghan Ministry of Communications signed a $64.5 million US dollar deal with ZTE on the establishment of a countrywide fibre optical cable network to help improve telephone, internet, television and radio broadcast services not just in Kabul but throughout the country. Internet cafes were introduced in 2002 and has been expanding throughout the country. , 3G services were also available.

There were a number of post offices throughout the city. Package delivery services like FedEx, TNT N.V., and DHL were also available.

Hotels and other lodging
Major hotels in Kabul included; the Serena Hotel, the Inter-Continental, and the Safi Landmark Hotel above the Kabul City Center. Most visitors preferred lodging at guest houses, which were found all over the city. The better and safer ones were in the Wazir Akbar Khan neighbourhood where the embassies were located.
 Serena Hotel
  Inter-Continental
 Safi Landmark Hotel

Culture and landmarks

The old part of Kabul was filled with bazaars nestled along its narrow, crooked streets, examples being the Mandawi and the Bird Market (Ka Foroshi). Cultural sites included: the National Museum of Afghanistan, notably displaying an impressive statue of Surya excavated at Khair Khana, the ruined Darul Aman Palace, the tomb of Mughal Emperor Babur at Bagh-e Babur, and Chihil Sutun Park, the Minar-i-Istiqlal (Column of Independence) built in 1919 after the Third Afghan War, the tomb of Timur Shah Durrani, the Bagh-e Bala Palace and the imposing Id Gah Mosque (founded 1893). Bala Hissar was a fort which was partially destroyed during the Second Anglo-Afghan War, then restored as a military college. There was also the Kolola Pushta fort, which was garrisoned by the Afghan Army, and the nearby 19th-century Shahrara Tower fort, which was ruined in 1928. The Koh-e Asamai mountain had a temple that was considered important to Hinduism.

Other places of interest include Kabul City Center, which was Kabul's first shopping mall, the shops around Flower Street and Chicken Street, Wazir Akbar Khan district, Kabul Golf Club, Kabul Zoo, Abdul Rahman Mosque, Shah-Do Shamshira and other famous mosques, the National Gallery of Afghanistan, the National Archives of Afghanistan, Afghan Royal Family Mausoleum, the OMAR Mine Museum, Bibi Mahro Hill, Kabul Cemetery, and Paghman Gardens best known for the famous Taq-e Zafar arch. The Aga Khan Development Network (AKDN) was also involved in the restoration of the Bagh-e Babur (Babur Gardens).

Maranjan Hill (Tappe-i-Maranjan) was a nearby hill where Buddhist statues and Graeco-Bactrian coins from the 2nd century BC have been found. Outside the city proper lied the Buddhist Guldara stupa and another stupa at Shewaki. Paghman and Jalalabad were interesting valleys west and east of the city. On the latter road, about 16 miles east of the city, was the Tang-e Gharu gorge.

Kabul used to have as many as 23 cinemas, but currently only had four, including the state owned Ariana Cinema. The decline of cinema of Afghanistan since the 1990s, both due to war and oppressive regimes, had meant many of these have closed. The Nandari, or Kabul National Theater, was one of the largest theaters in Asia before it was destroyed in the civil war and has not been restored. The lack of investment meant that the sector did not recover after 2001, and notably the rundown Park Cinema was controversially demolished in 2020.

 Parks
 Bagh-e Babur (Gardens of Babur)
 Bagh-e Chihil Sutun (Gardens of Chihil Sutun)
 Bagh-e Bala Park
 Zarnegar Park
 Shokouh Zana
 Shahr-e Naw Park
 Bagh-e Zanana
 Chaman-e-Hozori
 Bibi Mahro Park
 Lake Qargha
 Mosques
 Abdul Rahman Mosque
 Id Gah Mosque
 Abul Fazl Shrine
 Sakhi Shrine
 Pul-e Khishti Mosque
 Shah-Do Shamshira Mosque
 Mausoleums
 Mausoleum of Timur Shah Durrani
 Mausoleum of Abdur Rahman Khan
 Mausoleum of Zahir Shah, Nadir Shah and other members of the royal Musahiban family
 Mausoleum of Jamal-al-Din al-Afghani
 Palaces
Tajbeg Palace
Stor Palace
Darul Aman Palace
Chihil Sutun Palace
Bagh-e Bala Palace
Shah Bobo Jan Palace
Arg (Presidential Palace), including numerous other palaces inside the compound
Char Chenar Palace
Delgusha Palace and its clock tower
Haram Sara Palace
Salam Khana Palace
Kuti Baghcha
 Museums
 National Museum of Afghanistan
 National Archives of Afghanistan
 National Gallery of Afghanistan
 Negaristani Milli
Other landmarks
Clock tower at Mahmoud Khan Bridge
Minaret of Knowledge and Ignorance
Minaret of the Unknown Corps on Jada-e Maiwand
Sherpur Cantonment (British Cemetery)

Architecture

Kabul's various architectural designs reflected the various links it has had with empires and civilisations, particularly being on the ancient trade route connecting India and China with Persia and the West.

The Buddhist Chakari minaret was likely built in the Kushan era and had traces of Greco-Bactrian and Gandhara Art. It had Buddhist swastika and both Mahayana and Theravada qualities. Following the Islamic conquest, a new age of architectural realms appeared in the Kabul region. The Gardens of Babur was perhaps the best preserved example of Islamic and Mughal architecture. Emperor Babur had also built seven other big gardens in Kabul at the time. The present Gardens of Babur also reflect Afghanistan's traditional architecture by the wooden carving, pressed stucco, decorative stone masonry and other features. Another fine example of the Babur era is the Id Gah Mosque, using stones from the Punjab and Sindh and designed by Persians.

Ahmad Shah Durrani's rise as the Afghan ruler brought changes to Kabul and the nation, with a more inward-looking and self-protecting society reflecting the architecture that were no different between the rich and poor peoples. mausoleum of Timur Shah Durrani, the Afghan ruler until his death in 1793, was another example of Islamic design, built in an octagonal structure. It followed Central Asian traditions of decorative brick masonries along with a colorless appearance. After the Second Anglo-Afghan War, the country's emir Abdur Rahman Khan brought European styles for the first time. The Bagh-e Bala Palace was designed in a mixed Mughal and British Indian style, the first significant change from traditional Afghan and Islamic styles. However palaces were still built with Central Asian Islamic design at heart. Numerous lavish buildings were created during this time, combined with large gardens. The Dilkusha Palace within the Arg was the first created by a British architect. Its accompanying clock tower, circa 1911, was also a British creation.

Houses in Kabul during this time were generally made up of walled compounds, built around courtyards and having narrow passageways to places.

In the 1920s, new styles were strongly influenced by European architectural styles due to king Amanullah Khan's visits to Europe, particularly Berlin and Paris. Darul Aman Palace was the best known example of modern Western design. The Shah-Do Shamshira Mosque was built in an unusual style for a mosque in Western and Italian style baroque. The Taq-e Zafar in Paghman and other landmarks there were also based on European designs. Houses also became more open, without having many of the walls. Later in the century, several Soviet inspired designs made its way into Kabul. Most notable of these were the various microraions built in the city in the 1960s and afterwards. A different flavor of modern style was seen on the Hotel Inter-Continental Kabul and Serena Hotel.

In the 21st century, modern designs based on glass facades became popular. Examples of this modern Western style were the Kabul City Center and Golbahar Center. The National Assembly building opened in 2015 had elements of modern Islamic Mughal architecture, considered to have the largest dome in Asia. The Indian architecture could also be influenced by the fact it was built by the government of India, but its carving and large porch represent Afghan traditional architectural forms. The new Ministry of Defense building followed traditional, Islamic and Western designs inspired by the Pentagon. Another mix of these designs appeared on the Paghman Hill Castle completed in 2014. The construction boom with modern high-rises throughout the 2010s had led to a major change in the city's skyline.

Transportation

Kabul has no train service.

Air
It was a hub to Ariana Afghan Airlines, the national carrier of Afghanistan, as well as private airlines such as Afghan Jet International, East Horizon Airlines, Kam Air, Pamir Airways, and Safi Airways. Regional airlines such as Air India, SpiceJet, flydubai, Emirates, Gulf Air, Mahan Air, Pakistan International Airlines, Turkish Airlines and others also had regularly scheduled flights to the airport. A new international terminal was built by the government of Japan and began operation in 2008.

Road

The AH76 highway (or Kabul-Charikar Highway) connected Kabul north towards Charikar, Pol-e Khomri and Mazar-i-Sharif ( away), with leading roads to Kunduz ( away). The AH77 highway went west towards Bamiyan Province ( away) and Chaghcharan in the central mountains of Afghanistan. To the south-west, the Kabul-Ghazni Highway went to Ghazni ( away) and Kandahar ( away). To the south, the Kabul-Gardez Highway connected it to Gardez ( away) and Khost. To the east, the Kabul-Jalalabad Highway went to Jalalabad ( away) and across the border to Peshawar.

Much of the road network in downtown Kabul consisted of square or circle intersections (char-rahi). The main square in the city was Pashtunistan Square (named after Pashtunistan), which had a large fountain in it and was located adjacent to the presidential palace, the Central Bank, and other landmarks. The Massoud Circle was located by the U.S. Embassy and had the road leading to the airport. In the old city, Sar-e Chawk roundabout was at the center of Maiwand Road (Jadayi Maiwand). Once all roads led to it, and in the 16th century was called the "navel of Kabul". In the Shahr-e Naw district there were several major intersections: Ansari, Haji Yaqub, Quwayi Markaz, Sedarat, and Turabaz Khan. The latter, named after Turabaz Khan, connected Flower Street and Chicken Street. There were also two major intersections in western Kabul: the Deh Mazang Circle and Kote Sangi. Salang Watt was the main road to the north-west, whereas Asamayi Watt and Seh Aqrab (also called Sevom Aqrab) was the main road to western Kabul.

The steep population rise in the 21st century had caused major congestion problems for the city's roads. In efforts to tackle this issue, a 95 km outer ring road costing $110 million was approved in 2017. Construction would have taken five years and it will run from Char Asiab via Ahmad Shah Baba Mina, Deh Sabz ("Kabul New City" development area), the AH76 highway, Paghman and back to Char Asyab. A new bus public transport service was also planned to be opened in 2018 (see below). In September 2017, the head of the Kabul Municipality announced that 286 meters of pedestrian overpass footbridges will be built in eight busy areas "in the near future".

Under the Kabul Urban Transport Efficiency Improvement Project that was signed in 2014 and backed by the World Bank, the city has seen widespread improvements in road conditions, including the building of new pedestrian sidewalks, drainage systems, lighting and asphalted road surfaces. The project runs until 31 December 2019.

Private vehicles had been on the rise in Kabul since 2002, with about 700,000 cars registered as of 2013 and up to 80% of the cars reported to be Toyota Corollas. The number of dealerships had also increased from 77 in 2003 to over 550 by 2010. Gas stations were mainly private-owned. Bicycles on the road were a common sight in the city.

Public transport
The taxicabs in Kabul were painted in a white and yellow livery. The majority of these were older model Toyota Corollas. A few Soviet-era Russian cabs were also still in operation.

Long-distance road journeys were made by private Mercedes-Benz coach buses or vans, trucks and cars. Although a nationwide bus service was available from Kabul, flying was safer, especially for foreigners. The city's public bus service (Millie Bus / "National Bus") was established in the 1960s to take commuters on daily routes to many destinations. The service had about 800 buses. The Kabul bus system had discovered a new source of revenue in whole-bus advertising from MTN similar to "bus wrap" advertising on public transit in more developed nations. There was also an express bus that runs from downtown to Hamid Karzai International Airport for Safi Airways passengers.

An electric trolleybus system operated in Kabul from February 1979 to 1992 using Škoda fleet built by a Czechoslovak company (see Trolleybuses in Kabul for more). The trolleybus service was highly popular mainly due to its low price compared to the Millie Bus conventional bus service. The last trolleybus came to a halt in late 1992 due to warfare – much of the copper overhead wires were later looted but a few of them, including the steel poles, can still be seen in Kabul today.

In June 2017 Kabul Municipality unveiled plans for a new bus rapid transit system, the first major urban public transportation scheme. It was expected to open by 2018, but its construction had been hampered. In March 2021, a new city bus service was launched in Kabul using American vehicles built by IC Bus, and accompanied by newly built bus stops throughout the city. Five buses entered service on one route which is expected to be expanded to a fleet of 200 buses on 16 different routes.

Internet-based participatory planning 

In 2019, the Nagoya Institute of Technology, in partnership with the Kabul city Municipality, jointly agreed to deploy a digital platform, called D-Agree in urban planning to provide support for stakeholders to promote meaningful public participation and help reach consensus in Kabul city planning process.

From September 2019 until the Fall of Kabul (2021) in August 2021, the platform was used on behalf of Kabul Municipality to moderate more than 300 Kabul city-related planning discussions. 

In these discussions, more than 15,000 citizens participated in planning activities hosted by D-Agree and generated more than 71,000 opinions which catalogued into issue-based information system regarding urban-related thematic areas. 
Despite the Taliban take-over, D-Agree will continue to play an important role in facilitating urban planning and infrastructure-related consultations.

In 2022, United Nations reported that D-Agree Afghanistan is used as a digital and smart city solutions in Afghanistan.

D-Agree, is a discussion support platform with artificial intelligence–based facilitation. The discussion trees in D-Agree, inspired by issue-based information system, contain a combination of four types of elements: issues, ideas, pros, and cons. The software extracts a discussion's structure in real time based on IBIS, automatically classifying all the sentences.

Education

The Ministry of Education led by Ghulam Farooq Wardak was responsible for the education system in Afghanistan. Public and private schools in the city have reopened since 2002 after they were shut down or destroyed during fighting in the 1980s to the late 1990s. Boys and girls were strongly encouraged to attend school under the Karzai administration but many more schools were needed not only in Kabul but throughout the country. The Afghan Ministry of Education had plans to build more schools in the coming years so that education was provided to all citizens of the country. High schools in Kabul included:
 Abdul Rahim-e-Shaheed High School, a school for boys and girls (up to Year 6) founded in 1970
 Habibia High School, a British-Afghan school founded in 1903 by King Habibullah Khan
 Lycée Esteqlal, a Franco-Afghan school founded in 1922
 Malalai High School, a Franco-Afghan school for girls
 Amani High School, a German-Afghan school for boys founded in 1924
 Aisha-i-Durani School, a German-Afghan school for girls
 Rahman Baba High School, an American-Afghan school for boys
 International School of Kabul, an American-Afghan school
 Afghan Turk High Schools, Turkish-Afghan schools
 Ghulam Haider Khan High School, a school for boys
 Abdul Hadi Dawi High School, a school for boys
 Nazo Ana High School, a school for boys

Universities
Universities included:
 American University of Afghanistan
 Kabul University
 Kabul Medical University
 Kabul Polytechnic University  
 Kabul Education University of Rabbani 
 Kateb University
 Kardan University
 Afghan National Security University
 Bakhtar University
 Dawat University
 Dunya University of Afghanistan (DUA)
 Gawharshad Institute of Higher Education
 Gharjistan University
 Afghanistan Institute Of Higher Education
 Kaboora Institute of Higher Education
 Kabul Health Sciences Institute
 Karwan University
 Khatam Al-Nabieen University
 Maryam University
 Mashal University
 Qalam institute of higher education
 Rana Institute of Higher Education
 Rifah Afghanistan Institute
 Salam University

Health care

Health care in Afghanistan was relatively poor. The wealthy Afghans usually went abroad when seeking treatment.

Jinnah Hospital
French Medical Institute for Children
 Kabul City Hospital
 Indira Gandhi Children's Hospital
 Jamhuriat Hospital
 Sardar Mohammad Daud Khan Hospital
 Wazir Akbar Khan Hospital
 Malalai Maternity Hospital
 Rabia-I-Balki Maternity Hospital
 Maywand Hospital
 Afshar Hospital
 Noor Eye Hospital
 Atatürk Children's Hospital
 American Medical Center Afghanistan
 DK-German Medical Diagnostic Center
 CURE International Hospital
 KIA ISAF Role 3 Hospital

Notable people
 
 
 Abdullah Abdullah (born 1960), former chief executive officer of Afghanistan
 Leena Alam (born 1978), film actress
 Zubayr Amiri (born 1990), footballer who plays for SC Hessen Dreieich and the Afghanistan national team
 Asghar Afghan, retired cricketer, Afghanistan's former captain and ended his career with the highest T20I wins as a captain.
 Hafizullah Amin (born 1929), former Prime Minister of Afghanistan
 Zamina Begum (born 1917), former Afghan princess
 Shukria Barakzai (born 1972), Afghan Politician and former Ambassador of Afghanistan to Norway
 Farhad Darya (born 1962), singer
 Salim Durani (born 1934), former cricketer. He is the only Indian Test cricketer to have been born in Afghanistan.
 Ghezaal Enayat (born 1989), singer
 Wahida Faizi (born 1994), journalist
 Farahnaz Forotan (born 1992), journalist
 Azita Ghanizada (not disclosed), American actress
 Mozhdah Jamalzadah (born 1982), singer, actress, and talk show host
 Karim Janat, cricketer, brother to Asghar Afghan
 Naveen-ul-Haq (born 1999), cricketer
 Khaled Hosseini (born 1965), Afghan-American novelist
 Habibullāh Kalakāni (born 1890), politician and ruler of Afghanistan from 17 January to 13 October 1929
 Babrak Karmal (born 1929), former President of Afghanistan
 Amanullah Khan (born 1892), First as Emir of Afghanistan and after 1926 as King, until his abdication in 1929
 Abdur Rahman Khan (born between 1840 and 1844), Emir of Afghanistan
 Sher Ali Khan (born 1825), Former Emir of Afghanistan
 Annet Mahendru (born 1985),  Afghan-born American actress
 Ahmad Khan Mahmoodzada (born 1994), former child actor.
 Sibghatullah Mojaddedi (born 1925), former President of Afghanistan
 Nainawaz (born 1935), artist, poet and composer
 Omar Nazar (born 1978), footballer
 Sayed Hamid Noori (born 1965), journalist
 Homeira Qaderi (born 1980), writer
 Seeta Qasemi (born 1979), singer 
 Anahita Ratebzad (born 1931), former Minister of Social Affairs and Tourism of Afghanistan
 Mohammed Zahir Shah (born 1933),  the last king of Afghanistan
 Abdul Rahim Sarban (born 1930),  singer 
 Roya Rahmani (born 1978),  Former Afghan Diplomat, who has served as Afghanistan's first female ambassador to the United States.
 Hamid Rahimi (born 1983),  boxer
 Vida Samadzai (born 1978),  model
 Mohammad Hussain Sarahang (born 1924), singer
 Aryana Sayeed (born 1985), singer 
 Ahmad Zahir (born 1946), singer

Twin towns – sister cities
 Ankara, Turkey (since 2003)
 Istanbul, Turkey (since 1992)
 Kazan, Russia (since 2005)
Omaha, Nebraska, United States (since 2003)
Kansas City, Missouri, United States (since 2018)

See also

 List of cities in Afghanistan
 2002 Hindu Kush earthquakes
 List of terrorist attacks in Kabul
 Kabul Province
 Kabul Airport
 List of rulers of Kabul
 Timeline of Kabul

References

Further reading
 
 
 Hill, John E. (2009). Through the Jade Gate to Rome: A Study of the Silk Routes during the Later Han Dynasty, 1st to 2nd centuries CE. Charleston, South Carolina: BookSurge. .

External links

 People of Kabul – report by Radio France Internationale in English

 
2nd-millennium BC establishments
Capitals in Asia
Cities in Afghanistan
Kabul Shahi
Places in Shahnameh
Populated places along the Silk Road
Populated places established in the 2nd millennium BC
Populated places in Kabul Province
Provincial capitals in Afghanistan